The Popular Action Bloc is a political bloc in Kuwait headed by veteran former Speaker Ahmed Al-Sadoun. The group focuses on populist issues like housing, salary raises, and reform.

Expulsion of Shiite MPs
On 19 February 2008, the Popular Action Bloc expelled Shiite MPs Ahmed Lari and Adnan Zahid Abdulsamad for taking part in a ceremony eulogizing Hezbollah's slain top commander, Imad Mughniyah.  The ceremony's description of the fugitive Lebanese militant – killed in a 12 February car bombing in Syria – as a hero sparked public outrage in a country that holds him responsible for hijacking a Kuwait Airways flight and killing two of its Kuwaiti passengers 20 years ago. The two lawmakers were only expelled from their bloc and remained in the legislature.  After the expulsions of the two, the seven member bloc was down to five members.

Electoral history

National Assembly elections

References

1992 establishments in Kuwait
Political parties established in 1992
Political parties in Kuwait
Kuwaiti nationalism